The 2017 McNeese State Cowboys football team represented McNeese State University in the 2017 NCAA Division I FCS football season. The Cowboys were led by second-year head coach Lance Guidry and played their home games at Cowboy Stadium. They were a member of the Southland Conference. They finished the season 9–2, 7–2 in Southland play to finish in a tie for third place. They did not receive an at-large birth to the FCS Playoffs.

Previous season
The Cowboys finished the 2016 season 6–5, 5–4 in Southland play to finish in a tie for fourth place.

Schedule

Game summaries

@ Nicholls

Sources:

Florida Tech

Sources:

@ Alcorn State

Sources:

Houston Baptist

Sources:

@ Stephen F. Austin

Sources:

@ Abilene Christian

Sources:

Incarnate Word

Sources:

@ Central Arkansas

Sources:

Southeastern Louisiana

Sources:

Northwestern State

Sources:

@ Lamar

Sources:

Ranking movements

References

McNeese State
McNeese Cowboys football seasons
McNeese State Cowboys football